Lilatilakam (IAST: Līlā-tilakam, "diadem of poetry") is a 14th century Sanskrit-language treatise on the grammar and poetics of the Manipravalam language form, a precursor of the modern Malayalam language spoken in the Kerala state of India.

Date and authorship 

Lilatilakam is an anonymous work, and is generally dated to the late 14th century. It is attested by two (possibly three) manuscripts, and is not referred to by any other surviving pre-modern source.

Contents 

Lilatilakam (literally "diadem of poetry") calls itself the only disciplinary treatise (shastra) on Manipravalam, which it describes as the "union" of Sanskrit and Kerala-bhasha (the regional language spoken in Kerala).

The text is written in Sanskrit language, in form of a series of verses with commentary; it also features examples of Manipravalam-language verses.

References

Bibliography 

 
 </ref>

Grammar books
14th-century books
Indian books
Sanskrit literature
Malayalam language